OST may refer to:

Music 
 Original soundtrack
 O.S.T., an alias of electronic musician Chris Douglas
 O.S.T. (album), by the People Under the Stairs

Science and technology 
 Object Storage Target in computing, used by the Lustre file system an others
 Oligosaccharyltransferase, an enzyme
 Open-space technology, for organising meetings
 Orbit stabiliser theorem in mathematics
 Offline Storage Table, a Microsoft file format
 OST Family (organic solute transporter) of genes
 Origins Space Telescope, a space telescope mission
 Open Source Threat, any software demonstrating a device vulnerability that is open-source

Organizations 
 Office of Science and Technology, a British government agency
 Office of Secure Transportation, a US government agency
 Organisation Socialiste des Travailleurs, the Socialist Workers Organisation of Senegal
Outer Space Treaty, a treaty regulating international law in outer space.

Places 
 Ostend–Bruges International Airport, Belgium, IATA code
 Old Spanish Trail (auto trail)

Other uses 
 Ost (surname)